Nourhan Ibrahim Shoeib (born 15 January 1982) is an Egyptian actress.

Career
In 2009, Nourhan was featured in the television series directed by Jaber Nasser Al Rahma and Mamdouh Fahmy entitled, Women with No Regret.

She was featured in the 2017 film, Memory Card, directed by Khaled Mehran and written by Mahmoud Fleifal. Others featured include: Khaled Selim, Rania Mahmoud Yassin, Muhammad Najati and Izzat Abu Auf.

See News announced her participation in the musical programme, "Sound of Music", as a Project manager in the National Theatre Festival.

She starred in the 2020 television dram series, Our 80's Nights, written by Ahmed Abdel Fattah, directed by Ahmad Saleh.

Filmography

Film

Television

References

External links
 Nourhan on IMDb
 Nourhan on Elcinema
 Nourhan Shoeib on Omneeyat
 Nourhan on Listal
 Nourhan on Karohat

 Egyptian actresses
Living people
1982 births